This is a list of countries that have officially designated one or more animals as their national animals.

National animal

See also

 State animal
 List of national birds
 Animals as heraldic charges
 Floral emblem
 National personification

References 

Animal